The Brooklyn Aces are a defunct minor professional ice hockey team that played the 2008-09 season in the Eastern Professional Hockey League. They played their home games at the 2,500 seat Aviator Arena.

On June 17, 2008 the Brooklyn Aces announced Chris Firriolo as the team's first head coach.

Notable players
On March 21 and 22, 2009, former New York Ranger great, Ron Duguay, suited up to play two games in the EPHL, one game with the Brooklyn Aces and the other with the Jersey Rockhoppers, to raise money for the Garden of Dreams Foundation, a nonprofit organization associated with Madison Square Garden. Duguay signed a waiver, and played his game with the Brooklyn Aces without a helmet, which allowed his hair to flow free as it did when he played in the NHL. With 37 seconds left in regulation, he assisted on the game-tying goal, but the Aces would lose 4-3 in overtime.

References

External links
 Brooklyn Aces Official Site
 Independent Brooklyn Aces Coverage written by journalist Patrick Hickey Jr.
 The Internet Hockey Database: Brooklyn Aces (EPHL)

Eastern Professional Hockey League (2008–09) teams
Ice hockey teams in New York (state)
Sports in Brooklyn
Sports teams in New York City
2008 establishments in New York City
Ice hockey clubs established in 2008
Ice hockey clubs disestablished in 2009
2009 disestablishments in New York (state)